Cothurus is a genus of beetles in the family Mordellidae, containing the following species:

 Cothurus bordoni Franciscolo, 1987
 Cothurus iridescens Champion, 1891

References

Mordellinae
Mordellidae genera